The women's singles tennis event at the 2014 Asian Games took place at the Yeorumul Tennis Courts, Incheon, South Korea from 24 September to 30 September 2014.

Schedule
All times are Korea Standard Time (UTC+09:00)

Results

Finals

Top half

Section 1

Section 2

Bottom half

Section 3

Section 4

References
 Draw

External links
Official website

Tennis at the 2014 Asian Games